Smerinthus jamaicensis, the twin-spotted sphinx, is a moth of the family Sphingidae. The species was first described by Dru Drury in 1773.

Distribution 
It is widely distributed across North America. It has been taken as far north as the Yukon.

Description 
It has a wingspan of – inches (4.5–8.3 cm), with the outer margins of the forewings unevenly scalloped, but with the coastal margin of the hindwings being almost straight. Males have gray with black and white markings on their forewings, while females are yellowish brown with dark brown and white markings.

Both sexes have red hindwings with a pale yellow border. Sometimes a blue patch may appear as a single eyespot or it may be divided by black bands, creating two or three eyespots. Adult moths are nocturnal, but seem to prefer the earlier part hours of the night.

Biology 
The larvae feed on apple (Malus sylvestris), Prunus species (such as plums and peach), ash (Fraxinus), elm (Ulmus), poplar (Populus), birch (Betula), and willow (Salix).

See also
Smerinthus cerisyi
Smerinthus saliceti

References

External links

jamaicensis
Lepidoptera of the Caribbean
Moths of North America
Moths described in 1773
Taxa named by Dru Drury